Antonio Carmona Amaya (born 21 May 1965) is a Spanish gypsy singer of flamenco. He also has French nationality. From the early 1980s, he was a member of the Spanish flamenco-fusion group Ketama. that he joined after main vocalist Ray Heredia left. The band also included José Soto also known as "Sorderita". Ketama in its latest set-up included Antonio Carmona as main vocalist along with his brother, Juan José Carmona Amaya known as "El Camborio", and his cousin, José Miguel Carmona Niño known as "Josemi".

After break-up of the band in 2004, Carmona developed his own solo career and a series of solo albums including the debut album Vengo Venenoso published in 2006 by UNiversal Records and had collaborations with La Mala Rodriguez, Juanes and Alejandro Sanz. This was followed by the album De Noche in 2011 which included the single "El Camino De Los Sueños" featuring Nelly Furtado. It also had collaborations with Spanish singer Concha Buika.

He appeared in 1988 in Berlín Blues directed by Ricardo Franco. He had a lead role with Portuguese actress Maria de Medeiros in the 1997 film Go for Gold! directed by Lucien Segura. In 2000, he appeared in a role in the film Gitano starring Joaquin Cortés, Pilar Bardem and Laetitia Casta.

In 1996, he wrote the song "¡Ay, qué deseo! that represented Spain in the Eurovision Song Contest 1996. The song was interpreted by Antonio Carbonell during the contest.

In 2017, he appeared in a collaboration with Alejandro Sanz that included also the Spanish singers Pablo Alborán, David Bisbal and Manuel Carrasco with additional participation of Jesse & Joy, Juanes, Pablo López, Malú, Vanesa Martín, India Martínez, Antonio Orozco, Niña Pastori, Laura Pausini, Abel Pintos, Rozalen, Shakira, Tommy Torresin in the song "Y, ¿Si Fuera Ella?". The song topped the Spanish Singles Chart at number one.

Discography

Solo albums
Vengo Venenoso (2006)
De Noche (2011)
Obras Son Amores (2017)

Filmography
1988: Berlín Blues
1997: Go for Gold! as Quillo
2000: Gitano (English title Gipsy) as Romero

References

External links

Spanish male singers
1965 births
Living people
People from Granada
Spanish Romani people
Romani singers